Lucie Krausová (born 10 March 1986) is a Czech former competitive figure skater. She is the 2003 Karl Schäfer Memorial bronze medalist and a three-time (2001–2003) Czech national champion. She competed for four seasons on the ISU Junior Grand Prix circuit, winning one gold medal. She qualified to the free skate at three ISU Championships – 2001 Junior Worlds in Sofia, Bulgaria; 2002 Europeans in Lausanne, Switzerland; and 2003 Europeans in Malmö, Sweden. Her highest placement, 13th, came in Sweden.

Programs

Results
JGP: ISU Junior Grand Prix

References

External links
 

Czech female single skaters
1986 births
Living people
People from Náchod
Sportspeople from the Hradec Králové Region